Proto-Eskaleut, Proto-Eskimo–Aleut or Proto-Inuit-Yupik-Unangan is the reconstructed common ancestor of the Eskaleut languages, family containing Eskimo and Aleut. Its existence is known through similarities in Eskimo and Aleut. The existence of Proto-Eskaleut is generally accepted among linguists. It was for a long time true that no linguistic reconstruction of Proto-Eskaleut had yet been produced, as stated by Bomhard (2008:209). Such a reconstruction was offered by Knut Bergsland in 1986. Michael Fortescue (1998:124–125) has offered another version of this system, largely based on the reconstruction of Proto-Eskimo in the Comparative Eskimo Dictionary he co-authored with Steven Jacobson and Lawrence Kaplan (1994:xi).

Phonology 
Fortescue reconstructs the phoneme inventory of Proto-Eskaleut as follows:

Notes:

Possible relation to other language families 

There are no generally accepted relations between Proto-Eskaleut and other language families. A substantial case for a genetic relationship between Proto-Eskaleut, Yukaghir and Uralic was published by Michael Fortescue in 1998 in Language Relations across Bering Strait (see Uralo-Siberian languages).

References

Bibliography 
 Bergsland, Knut. 1986. "Comparative Eskimo–Aleut phonology and lexicon". Journal de la Société finno-ougrienne 80:63–137.
 Bomhard, Allan R. 2008. Reconstructing Proto-Nostratic: Comparative Phonology, Morphology, and Vocabulary, 2 volumes. Leiden: Brill.
 Fortescue, Michael, Steven Jacobson, and Lawrence Kaplan. 1994. Comparative Eskimo Dictionary with Aleut Cognates. Alaska Native Language Center.
 Fortescue, Michael. 1998. Language Relations across Bering Strait: Reappraising the Archaeological and Linguistic Evidence. London and New York: Cassell.

Eskaleut
Eskaleut languages